Thomas Fox   was an English priest.

Fox was  educated at Christ Church, Oxford. He held the living at Bromyard, herefordshire Fox was appointed Archdeacon of Hereford in 1698 and held the office until his death in 1728.

Notes

1728 deaths
17th-century English Anglican priests
18th-century English Anglican priests
Archdeacons of Hereford
Alumni of Christ Church, Oxford